The Valais Women's Cup was a Swiss invitational women's football tournament played each year in Châtel-St-Denis and Savièse. It was part of the Valais Summer Cups, and the female counterpart to the Valais Cup.

2013

Held from 22 – 25 September, the inaugural edition was contested by national teams, including London Olympics quarterfinalists Brazil and New Zealand. New Zealand won the tournament, its first trophy outside the OFC since the 1975 Asian Cup.

2014
The second edition was held from 7 – 9 August and switched from national teams to clubs. It was contested by French champion and runner-up Olympique Lyonnais and Paris St.-Germain, Spanish champion FC Barcelona and BeNe League's 8th RSC Anderlecht. The final confronted both French teams, with Lyon winning the trophy.

2015
It was held from 14 – 16 August, and it was contested by European runner-up Paris St.-Germain, French champion Olympique Lyonnais, German champion Bayern Munich and Swiss champion FC Zürich. Bayern won the trophy, beating defending champion Lyon in the final.

References

Women's football friendly trophies
Recurring sporting events established in 2013
Swiss football friendly trophies
women